Aharoni is a Hebrew language typeface created by Tuvia Aharoni for Ludwig & Mayer as a Hebrew version of Erbar-Grotesk, and later used by the Monotype Corporation and Kivun Computers Ltd, known best for its use in Microsoft Windows. Versions of it have been included in Windows 2000, XP, XP SP2, Server 2003, Server 2008, 7, 8, 10 and 11.

References

External links

 Microsoft Typography - Aharoni

Hebrew typefaces
Typefaces and fonts introduced in 1935